The 2011–12 RCD Espanyol season was the club's 81st year in its history.

La Liga

Copa del Rey

Round of 32

Round of 16

Quarter-finals

4–4 on aggregate. Mirandés won on away goals.

References

RCD Espanyol seasons
Espanyol season
Espanyol